Philip Christopher Hoffman (26 June 1878 – 20 April 1959) was a British trade unionist and Labour Party politician.

Born in London, Hoffman studied at the Coopers' Company and Coborn School in Stepney (now in Upminster), then the Warehousemen, Clerks and Drapers School at Purley.  He became a draper and an active trade unionist, and was soon working for the Shop Assistants Union.  In 1908, he was the union's South Wales Organiser.

Hoffman stood as the Labour Party candidate for South East Essex in 1922, and was elected at the 1923 general election.  He lost the seat in 1924, and in 1929 was instead elected for Sheffield Central.  He lost this seat in 1931 and narrowly failed to regain it in 1935.

After the second world war he authored 'They Also Serve' a history of the Shop Assistants Union.

References
Michael Stenton and Stephen Lees, Who's Who of British MPs: Volume III, 1919-1945

External links 
 

1878 births
1959 deaths
British trade unionists
Politics of Sheffield
Labour Party (UK) MPs for English constituencies
National Amalgamated Union of Shop Assistants, Warehousemen and Clerks-sponsored MPs
UK MPs 1923–1924
UK MPs 1929–1931
People educated at Coopers' Company and Coborn School
Members of the Parliament of the United Kingdom for South East Essex